Rogerinho is a nickname. Notable people with the name include:

Rogerinho (footballer, born 1979), born Rogerio Cannellini, Brazilian football midfielder
Rogerinho (footballer, born 1984), born Rogério Miranda Silva, Brazilian football attacking midfielder
Rogerinho (footballer, born 1987), born Rogério de Assis Silva Coutinho, Brazilian football forward
Rogerinho (footballer, born 1996), born Rogério Joséda Silva, Brazilian football forward